This is a list of National Basketball Association players whose last names begin with A.

The list also includes players from the American National Basketball League (NBL), the Basketball Association of America (BAA), and the original American Basketball Association (ABA). All of these leagues contributed to the formation of the present-day NBA.

Individuals who played in the NBL prior to its 1949 merger with the BAA are listed in italics, as they are not traditionally listed in the NBA's official player registers.

A
  
Alaa Abdelnaby
Zaid Abdul-Aziz
Kareem Abdul-Jabbar
Mahmoud Abdul-Rauf
Tariq Abdul-Wahad 
Shareef Abdur-Rahim
Tom Abernethy
Forest Able
John Abramovic
Álex Abrines
Precious Achiuwa
Alex Acker  
Don Ackerman  
Mark Acres
Bud Acton
Quincy Acy
Alvan Adams
Don Adams
George Adams
Hassan Adams
Jaylen Adams
Jordan Adams
Michael Adams
O'Neal Adams
Ray Adams
Sparky Adams
Steven Adams
Willie Adams
Rafael Addison
Bam Adebayo
Deng Adel
Rick Adelman 
Jeff Adrien
Arron Afflalo
Maurice Ager
Ochai Agbaji
Mark Aguirre
Blake Ahearn
Jake Ahearn
Danny Ainge
Matt Aitch
Warren Ajax
Alexis Ajinça 
Henry Akin
Josh Akognon
DeVaughn Akoon-Purcell
Solomon Alabi
Mark Alarie
Gary Alcorn
Santi Aldama
Furkan Aldemir
Cole Aldrich
LaMarcus Aldridge
Chuck Aleksinas
Cliff Alexander
Cory Alexander
Courtney Alexander
Gary Alexander
Joe Alexander
Kyle Alexander
Merle Alexander
Ty-Shon Alexander
Victor Alexander
Nickeil Alexander-Walker
Steve Alford
Rawle Alkins
Bill Allen
Bob Allen
Grayson Allen
Jarrett Allen
Jerome Allen
Kadeem Allen
Lavoy Allen
Lucius Allen
Malik Allen
Randy Allen
Ray Allen
Tony Allen
Will Allen
Odis Allison
Lance Allred
Darrell Allums
Morris Almond
Derrick Alston
Rafer Alston
Leonard Alterman
Peter Aluma
Jose Alvarado
Al Alvarez
Bob Alwin
John Amaechi
Ashraf Amaya
Al-Farouq Aminu
Ralph Amsden
Lou Amundson
Bob Anderegg
Chris Andersen
David Andersen
Alan Anderson
Andrew Anderson
Antonio Anderson
Art Anderson
Carl Anderson
Cliff Anderson
Dan Anderson (b. 1943)
Dan Anderson (b. 1951)
Derek Anderson
Dwight Anderson
Eric Anderson
Gene Anderson
Cadillac Anderson
J. J. Anderson
James Anderson
Jerome Anderson
Justin Anderson
Kenny Anderson
Kim Anderson
Kyle Anderson
Michael Anderson
Nick Anderson
Richard Anderson
Ron Anderson
Ryan Anderson
Shandon Anderson
Willie Anderson
Wally Anderzunas
Ernie Andres
Martynas Andriuškevičius
Don Anielak
Ike Anigbogu
Michael Ansley
Chris Anstey
Giannis Antetokounmpo
Kostas Antetokounmpo
Thanasis Antetokounmpo
Carmelo Anthony
Cole Anthony
Greg Anthony
Joel Anthony
Paul Anthony
Pero Antić
Clyde Anton
OG Anunoby
Keith Appling
Rafael Araújo
Stacey Arceneaux
Gerry Archibald
Nate Archibald
Robert Archibald
Ryan Arcidiacono
Jim Ard
Gilbert Arenas
Trevor Ariza
Paul Arizin
Joe Arlauckas
B. J. Armstrong
Bob Armstrong (b. 1920)
Bob Armstrong (b. 1933)
Brandon Armstrong
Curly Armstrong
Darrell Armstrong
Hilton Armstrong
Scotty Armstrong
Tate Armstrong
Fred Arndt
Jesse Arnelle
Jay Arnette 
Bob Arnzen
Stan Arnzen
Carlos Arroyo
Ron Artest
Darrell Arthur
John Arthurs
Jamel Artis
Bill Ash
Ömer Aşık
Vincent Askew
Keith Askins
Don Asmonga
Dick Atha
Chucky Atkins
Al Attles
Chet Aubuchon
Stacey Augmon
D. J. Augustin
James Augustine
Isaac Austin
John Austin
Ken Austin 
Carl Austing
Deni Avdija
Anthony Avent
Bird Averitt
William Avery
Dennis Awtrey
Joël Ayayi
Gustavo Ayón
Jeff Ayres
Deandre Ayton
Kelenna Azubuike
Udoka Azubuike

References
  NBA & ABA Players with Last Names Starting with A @ basketball-reference.com
 NBL Players with Last Names Starting with A @ basketball-reference.com

A